Neilton is an unincorporated community and census-designated place (CDP) in Grays Harbor County, Washington, United States. The population was 315 at the 2010 census.

Geography
Neilton is located in northern Grays Harbor County at  (47.403574, -123.887303), within Olympic National Forest along U.S. Route 101. The CDP extends north along US 101 to Boulder Creek and south to Cook Creek, while to the east it runs to the  crest of Quinault Ridge. US 101 leads north  to Amanda Park and south  to Humptulips.

Climate
The climate in this area has mild differences between highs and lows, and there is adequate rainfall year-round.  According to the Köppen Climate Classification system, Neilton has a marine west coast climate, abbreviated "Cfb" on climate maps.

Demographics
As of the census of 2000, there were 345 people, 128 households, and 96 families residing in the CDP. The population density was 35.8 people per square mile (13.8/km2). There were 138 housing units at an average density of 14.3/sq mi (5.5/km2). The racial makeup of the CDP was 88.41% White, 4.35% Native American, 5.22% from other races, and 2.03% from two or more races. Hispanic or Latino of any race were 6.09% of the population.

There were 128 households, out of which 40.6% had children under the age of 18 living with them, 64.8% were married couples living together, 4.7% had a female householder with no husband present, and 25.0% were non-families. 19.5% of all households were made up of individuals, and 8.6% had someone living alone who was 65 years of age or older. The average household size was 2.70 and the average family size was 3.06.

In the CDP, the population was spread out, with 29.0% under the age of 18, 6.7% from 18 to 24, 25.2% from 25 to 44, 27.2% from 45 to 64, and 11.9% who were 65 years of age or older. The median age was 38 years. For every 100 females, there were 111.7 males. For every 100 females age 18 and over, there were 100.8 males.

The median income for a household in the CDP was $35,250, and the median income for a family was $44,375. Males had a median income of $30,781 versus $26,250 for females. The per capita income for the CDP was $15,856. About 5.6% of families and 8.0% of the population were below the poverty line, including 7.8% of those under age 18 and none of those age 65 or over.

References

Census-designated places in Grays Harbor County, Washington
Census-designated places in Washington (state)